The Shell Service Station in Winston-Salem, Forsyth County, North Carolina, is a former filling station constructed in 1930 following a decision in the 1920s by the new local Shell distributor, Quality Oil Company, to bring brand awareness to the market in Winston-Salem. The building is an example of representational or novelty architecture and was listed on the National Register of Historic Places on May 13, 1976. It is located in the Waughtown-Belview Historic District at the corner of Sprague and Peachtree Streets.

History
This single-story Shell station, in the shape of a giant scallop shell, was built by R.H. Burton and his son, Ralph, in 1930 at Sprague and Peachtree Streets in Winston-Salem. The owners of the oil company decided to attract customers through a series of shell-shaped service stations. They built at least eight in the Winston-Salem area, but the station at Sprague and Peachtree is the only one remaining. The Shell station speaks to the literalism prevalent in some advertising during the 1920s and 1930s.

Preservation
Preservation North Carolina, an organization dedicated to the preservation of historic sites, spent one year and $50,000 to bring the landmark station back to its original condition. Workers removed layers of faded yellow paint to reveal the Shell's original yellow-orange color. The original front door was repaired and a crack fixed that had been previously sealed with nothing more than black tar. The wooden, trellised shelter that housed the car wash and allowed cars to be washed and/or serviced in the shade was reconstructed as well. Quality Oil Company donated restored gas pumps and replica lamp posts to help finish off the restoration. The landmark now serves as a museum for Preservation North Carolina.

See also
 Airplane Service Station, 1930 Powell, Tennessee station built in the shape of an airplane
 Beam's Shell Service Station and Office, 1930 Shell station also on the NRHP
 Teapot Dome Service Station, 1922 Zillah, Washington station built in the shape of a teapot

Notes

External links
Shell Station at oldgas.com - with a photograph of a shell-shaped station during construction
Preservation North Carolina details of the restoration project
 “Roadside Attractions”, a National Park Service Teaching with Historic Places (TwHP) lesson plan

Buildings and structures in Winston-Salem, North Carolina
Novelty buildings in North Carolina
Retail buildings in North Carolina
Roadside attractions in the United States
Shell plc buildings and structures
Transport infrastructure completed in 1930
Tourist attractions in Winston-Salem, North Carolina
Gas stations on the National Register of Historic Places in North Carolina
National Register of Historic Places in Winston-Salem, North Carolina
Individually listed contributing properties to historic districts on the National Register in North Carolina
1930 establishments in North Carolina